The 2015 Arizona United SC season was the club's second season. They played in the Western Conference of the United Soccer League.

Preseason 
All times from this point are on Mountain Standard Time (UTC−07:00)

USL

Results summary

League results

Western Conference standings

U.S. Open Cup

Statistics

Goalkeepers

Transfers

Loan in

Loan out

See also 
 2015 in American soccer
 2015 USL season
 Arizona United SC

References 

2
Arizona United SC
Arizona United SC
Arizona United SC
Arizona United SC